The Dongfeng Yufeng (东风御风) or Dongfeng E-Travel is a light commercial van produced by the Chinese automaker Dongfeng since 2012.

Overview

The Dongfeng Yufeng launched in 2012 was powered by a 3.0 liter fuel injected turbo diesel engine with a maximum horsepower of 136 hp and a torque of 300N·m. Three wheelbase models were available including a 3100mm short wheelbase version, a 3610mm regular wheelbase version, and a 4210mm long wheelbase version. Two variants of roof heights were also offered including a 2317mm regular version and a 2532mm tall roof version. All versions available as passenger or panel van models.

A facelift model was revealed in July 2016 with the updated powertrain qualified for the National Standard V emissions regulation in China.

References

External links

Dongfeng Official website

Yufeng
Vans
Minibuses
Cars of China
Vehicles introduced in 2012